Kiong Kong Tuan (1790–1854) was a Chinese merchant from Penang. He was a merchant in Penang before establishing himself in Singapore. Kiong Kong Tuan held the revenue farms for opium in the 1830s, and also for spirits. He had a spirit factory at Pearl's Hill, and the site was known among the Chinese as Chiu-long-san ("Spirit Factory Hill"). He was known to have held the opium and spirit farms in 1848, and was the last opium farmer in Singapore. He was also involved in coffee and real estate. In the 1840s he had  of coffee planted near Jurong. Kiong was the grantee of a large,  tract of land, with Chin Swee Road as the main artery and Cornwall Street and Seok Wee Road as side streets, which was a densely-populated Straits Chinese residential quarter.

Kiong married a daughter of Choa Chong Long, by whom he had an only son, Kiong Seok Wee, and several daughters, one of whom became the wife of Wee Bin of the steamship firm Wee Bin & Co. He died at the age of 64 on 16 January 1854. Kiong was of Hokkien ethnicity from southern Fujian region.

See also

 The Singapore Encyclopedia
 A social history of the Chinese in Singapore and Malaya, 1800-1911 By Chʻing-huang Yen , 
 Guardian of the South Seas: Thian Hock Keng and Singapore Hokkien Huay Kuan By Xinjiapo Fujian hui guan by Xinjiapo Fujian hui guan published by Singapore Hokkien Huay Kuan, 2006

References

Hokkien businesspeople
Singaporean people of Hokkien descent
Malaysian people of Hokkien descent
Malaysian people of Chinese descent
Malaysian emigrants to Singapore
1790 births
1854 deaths